The Archaeological Society of Connecticut was founded in New Haven in 1934. It has published a journal, the Bulletin of the Archaeological Society of Connecticut, since 1935, the complete run of which is available to view online without subscription. The president of the society is currently David Leslie, PhD, who is the Senior Archaeologist at Archaeological and Historical Services in Storrs.

References 

1934 establishments in Connecticut
Archaeological organizations
Organizations based in Connecticut
University of Connecticut